Giuseppe Ruzzolini (21 May 1930 - 16 April 2007) was an Italian cinematographer.

Career

Ruzzolini is known for lensing such films as Stephen King's Firestarter, Oedipus Rex, Sergio Leone's Duck, You Sucker!, and My Name is Nobody.

Filmography

References

External links

Italian cinematographers
1930 births
2007 deaths
Film people from Rome